McSaveney Spur is a prominent rock spur  northeast of Mount Bastion in the Willett Range of Victoria Land, Antarctica. The spur descends northeast from the plateau level toward the northwest flank of Webb Glacier. It was named by the Advisory Committee on Antarctic Names for husband and wife geologists Maurice J. McSaveney and Eileen R. McSaveney, who made investigations of Meserve Glacier and the Wright Valley area, he in 1968–69, 1971–72 and 1973–74; she in 1969–70 and 1971–72.

References

Ridges of Victoria Land
Scott Coast
Willett Range